Jell-O is a brand name for a fruit-flavoured gelatin.

Jello may refer to:

In music
 Jello Biafra (born 1958), American lead singer and songwriter for the San Francisco punk rock band Dead Kennedys
 Jello, a stage name of Darrell Fitton, English electronic musician
 "Jello" (song), by Asian-American hip hop group Far East Movement
 "Jello", a song by Brockhampton from Saturation II

Other uses
 Jello Shoecompany, an Austrian shoe retailer
 "Jello", original title of "Alpine Shepherd Boy", an episode of the TV series Better Call Saul

See also
 The Jell-O Belt, a colloquial geographical term in American English for the Mormon Corridor
 Sphyraena jello the pickhandle barracuda
 Jello Jello, a mountain in the Andes in Peru